Orecchia is an Italian surname meaning "ear". Notable people with the surname include:

Giovanni Orecchia (born  1925), Italian rugby league player
Michele Orecchia (1903–1981), Italian cyclist

Italian-language surnames